The Last Canadian is a 1974 science fiction novel by William C. Heine about the adventures of Eugene Arnprior after North America is devastated by a plague. The U.S. release of the novel was titled Death Wind.

Plot introduction
A 1970s Cold War apocalyptic story where Eugene Arnprior, an engineer living in Montreal, who after learning of a fast spreading airborne virus, moves his wife and two sons to an isolated cabin in Northern Quebec.

Movie
Though the 1998 movie The Patriot is credited as an adaptation of William C. Heine's novel The Last Canadian, it shares virtually no similarities with the novel except the idea of a deadly virus. No character names, events, or even locations appear in both the book and the film.

Explanation of title
Eugene Arnprior had just received in the mail a notice of his Canadian citizenship when the plague struck.  Therefore, he considered himself The Last Canadian.

References 

1974 Canadian novels
Post-apocalyptic novels
1974 science fiction novels
Novels set in Quebec
Dystopian novels
Canadian novels adapted into films
Canadian science fiction novels